Anthribinae is a subfamily of fungus weevils in the family of beetles known as Anthribidae. There are over 50 genera and more than 80 described species in Anthribinae.

Genera
 
 Acanthopygus Lucas, 1861 n
 Acorynus C.J.Schoenherr, 1833 n
 Allandrus LeConte, 1876 i c g b
 Anthribus Geoffroy, 1762 i c g b n 
 Araeoderes Schaeffer, 1906 i c g b
 Brachycorynus Valentine, 1998 i g b
 Cacephatus T.Blackburn, 1900 n
 Chirotenon Labram & Imhoff, 1840 n
 Dendropemon C.J.Schoenherr, 1839 n
 Dinema Fairmaire, 1849 i c g n
 Discotenes Labram & Imhoff, 1839 i c g b
 Disphaerona K.Jordan, 1902 n
 Dissoleucas K.Jordan, 1925 n
 Enedreytes Schönherr, 1839 n
 Eucorynus Schoenherr, 1823 n
 Eugonus Schoenherr, 1833 i c g b
 Eupanteos Jordan, 1923 n
 Euparius Schoenherr, 1823 i c g b n (fungus weevils)
 Eurymycter LeConte, 1876 i c g b
 Eusphyrus LeConte, 1876 i c g b
 Exechesops C.J.Schoenherr, 1847 n
 Exillis Pascoe, 1860 i c g
 Goniocloeus Jordan, 1904 i c g b
 Gonotropis LeConte, 1876 i c g b n
 Gymnognathus Schoenherr, 1826 i c g b
 Helmoreus 
 Ischnocerus Schoenherr, 1839 i c g b
 Jordanthribus Zimmerman, 1938 n
 Lawsonia Sharp, 1873 n
 Mauia Blackburn, 1885 i c g
 Noxius K.Jordan, 1936 n
 Ormiscus G. R. Waterhouse, 1845 i c g b n
 Ozotomerus Perroud, 1853 n
 Peribathys K.Jordan, 1937 n
 Phaenithon Schönherr, 1826 c g b
 Phaeniton Schoenherr, 1823 i
 Phloeobius Schoenherr, 1823 i c g n
 Phoenicobiella Cockerell, 1906 i c g b
 Phymatus Holloway, 1982 n
 Piesocorynus Dejean, 1834 i g b
 Platyrhinus Clairville, 1798 n
 Platystomos Sharp, 1873 n
 Pleosporius Holloway, 1982 n
 Ptychoderes Schoenherr, 1823 n
 Rhaphitropis E.Reitter, 1916 n
 Sharpius Holloway, 1982 n
 Stenocerus Schoenherr, 1826 i c g b
 Telala Jordan, 1895 n
 Toxonotus Lacordaire, 1866 i c g b n
 Trachitropis b
 Trachytropis Jordan, 1904 i c g
 Trigonorhinus Wollaston, 1861 i c g b n
 Tropideres C.J.Schoenherr, 1823 n
 Xenocerus C.J.Schoenherr, 1833 n
 Xylinada A.A.Berthold, 1827 n
 Xynotropis T.Blackburn, 1900 n

Data sources: i = ITIS, c = Catalogue of Life, g = GBIF, b = Bugguide.net n = NCBI

North American tribes
Anthribini
Basitropidini
Cratoparini
Discotenini
Gymnognathini
Ischnocerini
Piesocorynini
Platyrhinini
Platystomini
Stenocerini
Trigonorhinini
Tropiderini
Zygaenodini

References

 Lawrence, J. F., and A. F. Newton Jr. / Pakaluk, James, and Stanislaw Adam Slipinski, eds. (1995). "Families and subfamilies of Coleoptera (with selected genera, notes, references and data on family-group names)". Biology, Phylogeny, and Classification of Coleoptera: Papers Celebrating the 80th Birthday of Roy A. Crowson, vol. 2, 779–1006.
 Valentine, Barry D. / Arnett, Ross H. Jr., Michael C. Thomas, P. E. Skelley, and J. H. Frank, eds. (2002). "Family 126. Anthribidae". American Beetles, vol. 2: Polyphaga: Scarabaeoidea through Curculionoidea, 695–700.

Further reading

 Arnett, R. H. Jr., M. C. Thomas, P. E. Skelley and J. H. Frank. (eds.). (21 June 2002). American Beetles, Volume II: Polyphaga: Scarabaeoidea through Curculionoidea. CRC Press LLC, Boca Raton, Florida .
 Arnett, Ross H. (2000). American Insects: A Handbook of the Insects of America North of Mexico. CRC Press.
 Richard E. White. (1983). Peterson Field Guides: Beetles. Houghton Mifflin Company.

Anthribidae
Beetle subfamilies